Lunca is a commune in Botoșani County, Western Moldavia, Romania. It is composed of five villages: Băznoasa, Lunca, Stroiești, Stănești and Zlătunoaia.

References

Communes in Botoșani County
Localities in Western Moldavia